Calliostoma sarcodum is a species of sea snail, a marine gastropod mollusk in the family Calliostomatidae.

Description
The size of the shell varies between 8 mm and 16 mm.

Distribution
This species occurs in the Caribbean Sea, the Gulf of Mexico and off the Lesser Antilles at depths between 6 m and 12 m.

References

 Dall W. H. (1927). Small shells from dredgings off the southeast coast of the United States by the United States Fisheries Steamer "Albatross", in 1885 and 1886. Proceedings of the United States National Museum, 70(18): 1-134
 Dall, W. H. 1927. Diagnoses of undescribed new species of mollusks in the collection of the United States National Museum. Proceedings of the United States National Museum 70(2668): 1-11
 Clench, W. J. and C. G. Aguayo. 1946. Notes and descriptions of two new species of Calliostoma from Cuba. Revista de la Sociedad Malacológica "Carlos de la Torre" 4: 88-90
 Rosenberg, G., F. Moretzsohn, and E. F. García. 2009. Gastropoda (Mollusca) of the Gulf of Mexico, pp. 579–699 in Felder, D.L. and D.K. Camp (eds.), Gulf of Mexico–Origins, Waters, and Biota. Biodiversity. Texas A&M Press, College Station, Texas.

External links
 

sarcodum
Gastropods described in 1927